Kahleah Copper (born August 28, 1994) is an American professional basketball player for the Chicago Sky of the Women's National Basketball Association (WNBA). She was drafted by the Washington Mystics in 2016, and was traded to the Chicago Sky the next year.

In the 2016 WNBA draft, Copper was drafted with the seventh overall pick by the Washington Mystics. After playing one season for the Mystics, she was traded to the Chicago Sky. After three years as a bench player, she was elevated to a starting role in 2020. She emerged as a star player in 2021, being named a WNBA All-Star for the first time. Copper led the Chicago Sky during the 2021 playoffs, being named WNBA Finals MVP as the team won their first title in franchise history.

Early life and playing career
Copper is a native of North Philadelphia. She attended and played for the Preparatory Charter High School in Philadelphia. As a high school player, she was named to the All-Public League team in Philadelphia, the All-State team in Pennsylvania, and the McDonald's All-American team. She played for the Rutgers Scarlet Knights women's basketball team in college from 2012 to 2016, finishing her college career with the third-most points all time in team history (1,872).

Professional career

Washington Mystics (2016) 
Copper was drafted as the 7th overall pick in the 2016 WNBA draft by the Washington Mystics. She was a bench player in her first season, averaging 16.2 minutes and 6.2 points per game. After the season, she was traded to the Chicago Sky as part of a deal that sent Elena Delle Donne to the Mystics and Stefanie Dolson, Copper, and the 2nd overall pick in the 2017 WNBA draft to the Sky.

Chicago Sky (2017-present) 
In her first three seasons with the Sky, Copper generally came off the bench and averaged 6.7 to 7.1 points per game. In 2020, she was re-signed by the Sky. She was elevated to a starting role in the 2020 season, which was played in a "bubble" due to the COVID-19 pandemic, and led the team in scoring with 14.8 points per game. She continued into her starting role in the 2021 season, and was named as an All-Star for the first time. Copper led the Sky to their first championship in 2021 and was named 2021 WNBA Finals MVP.

European Leagues 
In the 2021–2022 season Copper played for Perfumerias Avenida in the Spanish League and the Euroleague. She was named the MVP of both leagues.

Career statistics

College

WNBA

Regular season 

|-
| style='text-align:left;'|2016
| style='text-align:left;'|Washington
| 30 || 3 || 16.2 || .417 || .467 || .683 || 3.1 || 0.8 || 0.5 || 0.1 || 1.1 || 6.2
|-
| style='text-align:left;'|2017
| style='text-align:left;'|Chicago
| 34 || 10 || 14.3 || .465 || .294 || .830 || 1.9 || 0.4 || 0.3 || 0.1 || 0.8 || 6.7
|-
| style='text-align:left;'|2018
| style='text-align:left;'|Chicago
| 33 || 2 || 15.9 || .397 || .375 || .875 || 2.2 || 0.6 || 0.3 || 0.2 || 1.0 || 7.1
|-
| style='text-align:left;'|2019
| style='text-align:left;'|Chicago
| 34 || 0 || 14.8 || .387 || .306 || .771 || 1.9 || 0.9 || 0.4 || 0.1 || 1.3 || 6.7
|-
| style='text-align:left;'|2020
| style='text-align:left;'|Chicago
| 22 || 22 || 31.3 || .496 || .344 || .737 || 5.5 || 2.1 || 1.0 || 0.2 || 2.5 || 14.9
|-
| style='text-align:left;background:#afe6ba;'|2021†
| style='text-align:left;'|Chicago
| 32 || 32 || 30.8 || .459 || .306 || .818 || 4.2 || 1.8 || 0.8 || 0.3 || 1.9 || 14.4
|-
| style='text-align:left;'|2022
| style='text-align:left;'|Chicago
| 31 || 31 || 28.7 || .481 || .356 || .775 || 5.7 || 2.3 || 0.5 || 0.0 || 2.0 || 15.7
|-
| style='text-align:left;'| Career
| style='text-align:left;'| 7 years, 2 teams
| 216 || 100 || 21.1 || .451 || .344 || .784 || 3.4 || 1.2 || 0.5 || 0.1 || 1.4 || 10.0

Playoffs 

|-
| style='text-align:left;'|2019
| style='text-align:left;'|Chicago
| 2 || 0 || 16.0 || .545 || .750 || 1.000 || 2.0 || 1.0 || 1.5 || 0.0 || 0.5 || 9.0
|-
| style='text-align:left;'|2020
| style='text-align:left;'|Chicago
| 1 || 1 || 35.0 || .500 || .500 || .250 || 0.0 || 4.0 || 2.0 || 0.0 || 2.0 || 17.0
|-
| style='text-align:left;background:#afe6ba;'|2021†
| style='text-align:left;'|Chicago
| 10 || 10 || 32.8 || .520 || .344 || .791 || 5.3 || 1.9 || 1.2 || 0.2 || 2.0 || 17.7
|-
| style='text-align:left;'|2022
| style='text-align:left;'|Chicago
| 8 || 8 || 30.5 || .452 || .346 || .795 || 3.8 || 0.9 || 1.6 || 0.4 || 1.8 || 16.8
|-
| style='text-align:left;'| Career
| style='text-align:left;'| 4 years, 1 team
| 21 || 19 || 30.4 || .492 || .379 || .775 || 4.1 || 1.5 || 1.4 || 0.2 || 1.8 || 16.5

Coaching career
Between the 2020 and 2021 WNBA seasons, Copper worked as an assistant coach for Purdue University Northwest's women's basketball team.

References

External links
Career information and player statistics from WNBA.com, NCAA.org, and Basketball-Reference.com

1994 births
Living people
American women's basketball players
Basketball players from Philadelphia
Chicago Sky players
Rutgers Scarlet Knights women's basketball
Shooting guards
Small forwards
Washington Mystics draft picks
Washington Mystics players
Women's National Basketball Association All-Stars
21st-century American women
American women's basketball coaches